Çok Güzel Hareketler 2 (in English: Very Beautiful Movements 2 or Nice Moves 2) is a Turkish comedy program directed by Yılmaz Erdoğan. It is the sequel to Çok Güzel Hareketler Bunlar.

On the show, the players perform and write sketches that are graded by Erdoğan and the audience.In 2017, It was premiered in BKM Theatre and continues in Europe and Turkey. In 2019, First episode started to release in Kanal D. Since 2022, It continues to release in Star Tv.

Also, A education series, titled "Yılmaz Erdoğan ile Öğrence" was released in TRT 2 which a state art canal. It is about script, cinema, stage.

Cast 

 Arif Güloğlu
 Atakan Çelik
 Ayşegül Yılmaz
 Batuhan Soyaslan
 Cenan Adıgüzel
 Cemile Canyurt
 Ebru Yücel
 Emin Oğuz Çelebi
 Emre Aslan
 Evliya Aykan
 Ezgi Özyürekoğlu
 Fatma Tezcan
 Hacı Ahmet Ak
 Metin Pıhlıs
 Ömer Faruk Çavuş
 Safa Sarı
 Selen Esen Çelebi
 Tuğba Yılmaz
 Hilmi Deler
 Yeşim Dursun

Series overview 
The table below provides general information about the topic:

References 

Turkish comedy television series
Kanal D original programming